Gibberellic acid (also called gibberellin A3, GA, and GA3) is a hormone found in plants and fungi. Its chemical formula is C19H22O6. When purified, it is a white to pale-yellow solid.

Plants in their normal state produce large amounts of GA3. It is possible to produce the hormone industrially using microorganisms.  Gibberellic acid is a simple gibberellin, a pentacyclic diterpene acid promoting growth and elongation of cells. It affects decomposition of plants and helps plants grow if used in small amounts, but eventually plants develop tolerance to it. GA stimulates the cells of germinating seeds to produce mRNA molecules that code for hydrolytic enzymes. Gibberellic acid is a very potent hormone whose natural occurrence in plants controls their development. Since GA regulates growth, applications of very low concentrations can have a profound effect while too much will have the opposite effect. It is usually used in concentrations between 0.01 and 10 mg/L.

GA was first identified in Japan in 1926, as a metabolic by-product of the plant pathogen Gibberella fujikuroi (thus the name), which afflicts rice plants. Fujikuroi-infected plants develop bakanae ("foolish seedling"), which causes them to rapidly elongate beyond their normal adult height. The plants subsequently lodge due to lack of support, and die.

Gibberellins have a number of effects on plant development. They can stimulate rapid stem and root growth, induce mitotic division in the leaves of some plants, and increase seed germination rates.

Gibberellic acid is sometimes used in laboratory and greenhouse settings to trigger germination in seeds that would otherwise remain dormant. It is also widely used in the grape-growing industry as a hormone to induce the production of larger bunches and bigger grapes, especially Thompson seedless grapes. In the Okanagan and Creston valleys, it is also used as a growth regulator in the cherry industry.  It is used on Clementine Mandarin oranges, which may otherwise cross-pollinate with other citrus and produce undesirable seeds.  Applied directly on the blossoms as a spray, it allows for Clementines to produce a full crop of seedless fruit.

GA is widely used in the barley malting industry. A GA solution is sprayed on the barley after the steeping process is completed. This stimulates growth in otherwise partly dormant kernels and produces a uniform and rapid growth.

See also
Abscisic acid (ABA)
Gibberellin
Plant hormone
6-Benzylaminopurine
Auxin

References

Plant hormones
Cyclohexenols
Tertiary alcohols
Lactones
Heterocyclic compounds with 5 rings
Vinylidene compounds
Plant growth regulators